Diard's trogon (Harpactes diardii) is a species of bird in the family Trogonidae.
It is found in Brunei, Indonesia, Malaysia, Singapore, and Thailand.
Its natural habitat is subtropical or tropical moist lowland forests.
It is threatened by habitat loss.

Apalodermatinae is the African subfamily consisting of one genus, Apaloderma. The Asian subfamily is Harpactinae and contains two genera, Harpactes and Apalharpactes.

Males are black headed and breasted with a pink breast line. Females are brown headed and breasted with pink under parts.
Diard's trogon eats caterpillars, beetles, stick-insects, locustids and other Orthoptera, and fruits.

The  breeding times of Diard's trogon range from February to August: February to mid-May in Malaysia, Mid-May to August in Borneo.

References

Diard's trogon
Birds of Malesia
Diard's trogon
Taxonomy articles created by Polbot